Rock House, also known as the John Martin House, is a historic home located near King, Stokes County, North Carolina. It was built about 1785, and is a two-story, fieldstone ruin.  It has been a ruin since the late-19th century.  It is believed to have been built by Colonel John Martin, an early landowner in Stokes County.  The property is maintained by the Stokes County Historical Society.

It was added to the National Register of Historic Places in 1975.

References

External links
Stokes County Historical Society website

Houses on the National Register of Historic Places in North Carolina
Houses completed in 1785
Houses in Stokes County, North Carolina
National Register of Historic Places in Stokes County, North Carolina